James Muir Mathieson, OBE (24 January 19112 August 1975) was a Scottish conductor and composer. Mathieson was almost always described as a "Musical Director" on many British films.

Career 
Mathieson was born in Stirling, Scotland, in 1911. After attending Stirling High School, he went to the Royal College of Music in London. In the 1930s he became head of the music department for Alexander Korda at Denham Film Studios; Mathieson being one of only three heads of Departments at London Films who were British. His first work was as an uncredited Musical Assistant on the 1933 film The Private Life of Henry VIII.

Mathieson told Korda that he did not wish to be a composer but wished to choose first rate composers and arrange and conduct their scores. Composer James Bernard called him the "Tsar of music for British films. If you wanted to write music for films at that time you had to be 'in' with Muir". Mathieson wanted to show the world the United Kingdom had composers of renown and "wanted to see British musical genius exploited throughout the world and recognised by other countries".

During his wartime service with the Ministry of Information, Mathieson is credited with commissioning film scores from Arthur Bliss, William Walton, Ralph Vaughan Williams and Malcolm Arnold. Jointly with the composer of the score for the 1953 film Genevieve – the harmonica player Larry Adler – Mathieson was nominated for an Academy Award, in his capacity as Musical Director. Under fierce pressure from the House Un-American Activities Committee, the composer's name was reluctantly omitted from the list of nominees. Mathieson's name as Musical Director (not as composer) went forward. Many years later, Adler's name as composer was restored to the list by the Academy.

Mathieson was also musical director on films with scores composed by others, most notably on Alfred Hitchcock's Vertigo in 1958, where he conducted Bernard Herrmann's score, later releasing an album of the music with the Sinfonia of London. In the year of Vertigo alone he is credited with musical directorship of 28 films. Overall he is said to have conducted the music for over a thousand British films. Due to the requirements of what constituted a British film for the Eady Levy, Mathieson's name was credited alongside non-British composers.

He married the ballet dancer Hermione Darnborough (1915–2010), whom he met in 1935 while conducting Hiawatha at the Royal Albert Hall in London. They had four children, including the actress Fiona Mathieson (1951–87), also a student of composition.

He conducted the Nottinghamshire County Youth Orchestra in the 1960s, and from the late 1960s until his death, he conducted the Oxfordshire County Youth Orchestra. He was made an Officer of the Order of the British Empire in 1957. Mathieson was also a mentor to the film composer Edward Williams, well known for composing the score for Life on Earth.

He was the elder brother of Dock Mathieson, who also had a career in film score arranging and conducting, although less prominently. On the death of Ernest Irving (Muir Mathieson's older counterpart at Ealing Studios) in October 1953, Dock took over the position as director of music at Ealing.

Selected film scores 
 Things to Come (1936)
 Hobson's Choice (1954)
 Trapeze (1956)
 Vertigo (1958)
 A Night to Remember (1958)
 Circus of Horrors (1960)
 What a Carve Up! (1961)
 Gorgo (1961)
 Crooks Anonymous (1962)
 Calamity the Cow (1967)

See also 
 Sinfonia of London

References

Further reading 
 Hetherington, S.J. (2006) Muir Mathieson: A Life in Film Music, Scottish Cultural Press,

External links 
 

1911 births
1975 deaths
People from Stirling
People educated at Stirling High School
Scottish composers
Scottish conductors (music)
British male conductors (music)
Jubilee Records artists
Deaths from esophageal cancer
Alumni of the Royal College of Music
20th-century British conductors (music)
20th-century British composers
20th-century Scottish musicians
20th-century British male musicians
British male film score composers